St MacNissi's College (now St Killian's College and colloquially known as Garron Tower) was a Roman Catholic grammar school located  to the north of Carnlough.

History

Garron Tower was built in 1850 at a cost of £4,000 as a summer residence by Frances Anne Vane, Marchioness of Londonderry. She had inherited this part of the Antrim estates from her mother, Anne Katherine MacDonnell, Countess of Antrim who married Sir Henry Vane-Tempest of County Durham.

From 1899 Garron Tower was leased by Henry McNeill Ltd and opened as a hotel. In December 1914 there was a major fire, and the following year McNeill's purchased it for £8,500 and repaired the damage. The hotel closed its doors in 1939.

In 1950 the buildings were acquired by Bishop Daniel Mageean for use as a boarding school for boys. The school opened in September 1951.

On 1 April 2010, St MacNissi's College and two other County Antrim schools, St Aloysius' College, and St Comgall's College, amalgamated to become St Killian's College. Initially St Killian's began its operations from two sites – the former St MacNissi's College site at Garron Tower and the former St Comgall's College site in Larne. The St Comgall's site has since been demolished and St Killian's now operates exclusively from the Garron Tower site.

Buildings

Main building
The college has extensive grounds which stretch for a mile or so around the main building. This main school building has about 30 classrooms, gymnasium, 100-desk study-hall, dining room, kitchens, cloakrooms, first-aid room, and offices. The tower and old building once provided living accommodation for priests. Many pieces by local artists such as Charles McAuley and Sam McLarnon hang in this old section of the school.

Chapel
The Chapel was completed in 1955 with the help of the late Fr Charles Agnew's "Mile of Half-Crowns". On the canopy above the High Altar are the words "Laudate Pueri Dominum" which translates as "Boys, Praise the Lord".

On one of the stained glass windows (in the Chapel dedicated to Our Lady, that Chapel to the left of the High Altar) which were installed in late 1956, the following words, in very small print, are to be found: "As I am making this window the Hungarians have risen in revolt against Communist/Russian rule in Hungary. October 1956".

Boarding rooms
A 150-room boarding department (now empty) was opened in 1956. Called St Mary's Residence, single rooms made up the majority of this building, but at the front ends there were double rooms, six in total, two on each floor, which were occupied by the college priests and latterly by brothers or prefects supervising the floors.

Original stables were the open dormitories of Ardclinis, Trostan, and Knocklayde. On the level above the Ardclinis Dormitory were the rooms of three priests. These old stables now house Music, Languages, and Business Studies classrooms. The building is known as St Joseph's.

Sports facilities
The Tennis Courts were situated in a small field which in the 1950s and early 1960s was called the "Wee Field". The £1.6 million block for IT, Home Economics, Art, and Science on the site of the old Tennis Courts. At the south end of the College grounds there is a wooded area in which the original owner's dog, Urisk, is buried. The headstone remains and on it is written:"Here Urisk lies and let the truth be told, This faithful dog was blind, infirm and old. Deaf to all else his mistress' voice he knew, Blind though he was, his step to her was true. So strong an instinct by affection fed, Endured till Urisk's vital spirit fled. Stoop grandeur from thy throne ye sons of pride, To whom no want is known, nor wish denied. A moment pause, and blush, if blush you can, To find in dogs more virtue than in man. And share, "midst all your luxury and pelf", one thought for others out of ten for self'".

At the north end there are four sports pitches and a set of Hand-Ball alleys (1 closed, 1 semi-closed and 1 open), all of which are the 60 × 40 type of alley. Behind the squash courts there is a new outdoor basketball court.

Presidents
 Very Rev. (Monsignor) William Tumelty BA STL HDipEd (1951–1966) (RIP)
 Very Rev. (Canon) Dominic McHugh BA (1966–1972)(RIP)
 Very Rev. Padraig McKavanagh BA (1972 -1977) (RIP)
 Very Rev. (Canon) Brendan McGarry BA BD (1977–1979) (RIP)
 Very Rev. (Monsignor) Thomas Bartley BA BD (1979–1985) (RIP)
 Very Rev. Dr (Canon) Raymund Fitzpatrick BA DCL (1985–1986) (RIP)
 Very Rev. (Canon) Alexander McMullan BA BD (1986–1989) (RIP)
 Very Rev. (Monsignor) Patrick Delargy BA STL MEd (1989–2002)
 Mr Peter Geoghegan (2002–2005)
 Mrs Eileen O'Loan (2009 -2010)

Alumni
 Derek Davis - Irish broadcaster
 Conleth Hill – film, stage and television actor
 Brendan O'Leary - political scientist
John McGarry - political scientist
 Declan O'Loan – SDLP politician
 Alasdair McDonnell – Member of Parliament for Belfast South (SDLP)
 Donal McKeown – Bishop of Derry

Other residences of the Marquesses of Londonderry

Londonderry House in London
Mount Stewart in County Down
Seaham Hall in County Durham
Wynyard Park in County Durham
Woollet Hall in Kent
Plas Machynlleth in Montgomeryshire

References

External links
Official school website

Grammar schools in County Antrim
Catholic secondary schools in Northern Ireland
Educational institutions established in 1951
Grade B1 listed buildings
Defunct schools in Northern Ireland
1951 establishments in Northern Ireland